"Touch Me, Kiss Me" is Fayray's 13th single. It was released on October 2, 2002 and peaked at #17. The song was used as the theme song for the movie "Ashita ga Aru sa THE MOVIE" as AX POWER PLAY #016 for the Nippon TV program "AX MUSIC-TV".  "I do" served as ending theme for the TV Tokyo anime "Cyborg 009" and the second coupling is a cover of Carole King's "So Far Away".

Track listing
Touch me, kiss me
I do
So far away

Charts 
"Touch me, kiss me" - Oricon Sales Chart (Japan)

External links
FAYRAY OFFICIAL SITE

2002 singles
2002 songs
Fayray songs
Japanese film songs
Songs written by Fayray
Avex Trax singles